Folketing elections were held in Denmark on 27 May 1853. Although elections had been held in February, the legislature was dissolved after the government failed to win a vote on who would succeed King Frederick VII on 18 April, resulting in early elections. Anders Sandøe Ørsted remained Prime Minister after the elections.

Electoral system
The elections were held using first-past-the-post voting in single-member constituencies. Only 14% of the population was eligible to vote in the elections, with suffrage restricted to men over 30 who were not receiving poor relief (or who had not paid back any previous poor relief received), were not classed as "dependents" (those who were privately employed but did not have a household) and who had lived in their constituency for a certain length of time.

Results

References

Folketing
1853 05
Denmark 2
Denmark